Pinton is a surname. Notable people with the surname include:

Andrea Pinton (born 1996), Italian footballer
Louis Pinton (born 1948), French politician
Matteo Pinton (born 1998), Italian footballer
Vincenzo Pinton (1914–1980), Italian fencer

See also
Hinton (name)